The 1994–95 season was the 98th season of competitive football in Scotland. This season saw the introduction of a fourth tier of league football (the Scottish 3rd Division) and also three points for a win being awarded instead of just two.

Notable events
Caledonian Thistle and Ross County make their debuts after being elected to the Scottish Football League, becoming the first Highland teams in the League's 104-year history.
Raith Rovers winning the first Scottish League Cup of their history with a shock win over Celtic in the final.
Celtic winning the Scottish Cup to end their six-year trophy drought.
Rangers winning the Scottish Premier Division title for the seventh year running – their 45th top division title overall.
Brian Laudrup, the Danish international forward, joining Rangers at the start of the season for £2.3million.
Duncan Ferguson ending his 18-month spell at Rangers and signing for Everton in December after two months on loan at the English club.
French international defender Basile Boli joining Rangers from Marseille in the pre-season for £2million and returning to his homeland with AS Monaco at the end of the season after picking up a league title medal.
At the same time as signing Basile Boli, Rangers paid a further £2million for Hearts defender Alan McLaren.
Legendary former Rangers, Motherwell and Scotland winger Davie Cooper dying suddenly in March at the age of 39 while on the books of Clydebank, where he was due to retire as a player at the end of the season.
Celtic spending the season playing their home games at national stadium Hampden Park while Parkhead was being rebuilt as an all-seater stadium.
Forfar Athletic becoming the very first champions of the Scottish Third Division.

Scottish Premier Division

Champions: Rangers
Relegated: Dundee United

Scottish League Division One

Promoted: Raith Rovers
Relegated: Ayr United, Stranraer

Scottish League Division Two

Promoted: Greenock Morton, Dumbarton
Relegated: Meadowbank Thistle, Brechin City

Scottish League Division Three

Promoted: Forfar Athletic, Montrose

Other honours

Cup honours

Individual honours

SPFA awards

SFWA awards

Scottish clubs in Europe

Average coefficient – 1.250

Scotland national team

Key:
(H) = Home match
(A) = Away match
ECQG8 = European Championship qualifying – Group 8

Notes and references

 
Seasons in Scottish football